The vice-president of Namibia serves as the acting President of Namibia when the President is outside the country's borders, unable to fulfill the duties of the office, or when the Presidency is vacant. The Vice-President is also a member of the National Assembly and the Cabinet. The Vice-President is constitutionally required to 'assist the President in the execution of the functions of government,' and may be assigned any government portfolio by presidential proclamation.

The position of Vice-President was established in 2014 along with several other constitutional amendments. The position is controversial due to its unclear portfolio. Nickey Iyambo served as the first Vice-President of Namibia from 2015 to 2018. The current Vice-President, appointed by President Hage Geingob is Nangolo Mbumba.

Key
Political parties

List of officeholders

See also
Namibia
Politics of Namibia
List of colonial governors of South West Africa
President of Namibia
Prime Minister of Namibia
Cabinet of Namibia
Lists of office-holders

References

External links
 World Statesmen – Namibia

Government of Namibia
Vice-Presidents
2014 establishments in Namibia
Vice presidents of Namibia
Namibia